Tamaqua (YTB-797) was a United States Navy  named for Tamaqua, Pennsylvania.

Construction
The contract for Tamaqua was awarded 15 June 1967. She was laid down on 16 January 1968 at Marinette, Wisconsin, by Marinette Marine and launched 14 August 1968.

Operational history
Tamaqua was assigned to the Pacific Fleet and has served at Naval Station Subic Bay throughout her career.

Stricken from the Navy List 25 May 2005, she was scrapped 18 October 2005.

References

External links
 

 

Natick-class large harbor tugs
Ships built by Marinette Marine
1968 ships